William T. Ingram (1913–2001) was an American theologian. He served as the first President of Memphis Theological Seminary from 1964 to 1978.

Early life
Ingram was born in 1913. His father, William Thomas Ingram, Sr., was a Cumberland Presbyterian minister. His brother, Joe Lynn Ingram, was also a minister. Ingram was ordained as a Presbyterian minister.

Career
Ingram served as a chaplain in the National Guard. He was a professor at Bethel College, McKenzie, Tennessee, from 1935 to 1937. During World War II, Ingram joined the United States Army and served as a chaplain from 1943 to 1946. After the war, he was Professor of Missions at the Cumberland Presbyterian Theological Seminary from 1946 to 1964.

Ingram was Dean of Cumberland Presbyterian Theological Seminary from 1962 to 1964 while the institution was located in McKenzie, Tennessee. He served as the first President of Memphis Theological Seminary from June 1, 1964 to September 1, 1978.

Death
Ingram died in 2001.

References

Bibliography
A History of Memphis Theological Seminary of the Cumberland Presbyterian Church 1852-1990: With a Brief Survey of Theological Education in the Cumberland Presbyterian Church from its Beginning in 1810. Memphis, Tennessee: Memphis Theological Seminary Press, 1990.

1913 births
2001 deaths
World War II chaplains
Bethel University (Tennessee)
Memphis Theological Seminary faculty